West Side Girl (Na'arat Haparvarim) is a 1979 Israeli drama film directed by George Ovadiah, and starring Ofra Haza, It sold 114,000 tickets in Israel.

Plot
Vered (Ofra Haza) is a beautiful blind girl who sells chocolates and cigarettes in the streets. Vered is a gifted singer. She meets three young men who become her friends and raise money for surgery to restore her sight. One of them steals the money, two of them get arrested and the third takes her to the hospital.
Vered is able to see again. After her friends leave prison and search for her, they find her in a music performance in Jerusalem. Although she never saw them, she recognize them and is excited to see them.

Cast 
 Ofra Haza as Vered
 Uri Selah as Avi 
 Menahem Einy as Chucho
 Avner Dan as Susita
 Ruth Bikel as Ruthie
 Reuven Dayyan as Yechezkel

See also
 Bourekas film
 Cinema of Israel

References

External links
 
 
 

1970s musical comedy films
1979 films
Films about blind people
1970s Hebrew-language films
Israeli comedy films
Israeli drama films
1979 comedy films